The Mount Elgon forest gecko (Ancylodactylus elgonensis) is a species of gecko endemic to Kenya and Uganda.

References

Ancylodactylus
Reptiles described in 1936